Anna Żelazko is a Polish football striker, currently playing for Unia Racibórz in the Ekstraliga. She previously played for Czarni Sosnowiec and AZS Wrocław. Żelazko has won six championships with Wrocław and Unia, and she was the season's top scorer in 2005, 2007 and 2009.

She is a member of the Polish national team since 2001.

Titles
 6 Polish Leagues (2006, 2007, 2008, 2010, 2011)
 6 Polish Cups (2001, 2002, 2007, 2009, 2010, 2011)

References

1983 births
Living people
Polish women's footballers
Place of birth missing (living people)
Women's association football forwards
RTP Unia Racibórz players
Górnik Łęczna (women) players
KKS Czarni Sosnowiec players